Red Beat Rahutraun is the third studio album by Thai recording artist Christina Aguilar. It became her biggest-selling album and has sold over 3,500,000 copies in Thailand. Christina spent nearly two years on the tour of this album. More than a half of the album has been promoted. "Mai Yak Rok" and "Rak Thur Thee Sud" became her iconic songs. "Mai Mee Crai Kho Rong" has been covered and re-arranged in English for her first English album Christina & Fern. "Na Thee Thee Ying Yai" was one of her most covered songs . "Pai Duai Kan Nah'" and "Yak Hai Roo Leua Kern...Wa Chan Sia Jai" are also well known nowaday. "Lerk Herh" was a hit on the stage in all of her concerts.

Track listing
 Mai Yak Rok (Not That Hard)
 Mai Mee Crai Kho Rong (No One Begs)
 Lerk Herh (Break Up)
 Lam Bak Hua Jai (Trouble in Mind)
 Na Thee Thee Ying Yai (Great Moment)
 Seu San Kan Noi (Let's Communicate)
 Pai Duai Kan Nah (Let's Go Together)
 Yom Pair (Surrender)
 Yak Hai Roo Leua Kern...Wa Chan Sia Jai (Want You To Know...That I'm Sorry)
 Ja Pai Jing Reu Plaw (Really Wanna Go)
 Rak Thur Thee Sud (Love You The Most)
 Khai Taw Rai (How Much Does It Cost?)

Christina Aguilar albums
Thai-language albums
1994 albums